Joseph Williams Lovibond (17 November 1833 – 21 April 1918) was a British brewer who developed the world's first practical colorimeter as a means of ensuring the high quality of his beer. He was the originator of the Degrees Lovibond scale.

Biography 

After accidentally losing his earnings from gold mining as a teenager, Lovibond went to work in his family's brewery. He discovered that coloration was a good index for assessing the quality of beer, and sought an accurate way of gauging color. After failed experiments with paint, on solids, a visit to Salisbury Cathedral in 1880 gave him the inspiration to use stained glass for his colorimeter, which he introduced in 1885.

Business 

In 1885 he founded a company, The Tintometer Limited, to manufacture his colorimeter which was called the Lovibond Comparator.  The company still exists and still produces an updated version of the Lovibond comparator.

Publications

Notes and references

External links 
 
 Tintometer Ltd

1833 births
1918 deaths
People from Fulham
Color scientists
Brewery workers